Georgios Pitharoulis (born 4 June 1990) is a Greek footballer who plays for Ierapetra.

Club career
Pitharoulis' career in the Super League began in 2007, when he signed a professional contract with OFI Crete. During the second half of the 2009–10 season, he competed for Panthrakikos in Super League Greece. He left in December 2010 Panthrakikos and joined to Beta Ethniki rival Panachaiki Patras. In summer 2011 after only a half year with Panachaiki F.C. signed in the Netherlands for Helmond Sport. Pitharoulis played only one Jupiler League game for Helmond Sport and returned in January 2012 to Greece, who signed now with AO Chania.

International career
Pitharoulis played the 2009 Mediterranean Games for Greece in the Football Competition in Pescara, Italy.

Career statistics

Date of last update: 7 March 2022

References

External links
Profile at epae.org

1990 births
Living people
Greek footballers
OFI Crete F.C. players
Panthrakikos F.C. players
Expatriate footballers in the Netherlands
Helmond Sport players
Greek expatriate footballers
Norwegian footballers
Association football midfielders
People from Levanger
Competitors at the 2009 Mediterranean Games
Mediterranean Games competitors for Greece
Sportspeople from Trøndelag